Sir Peter Parker, 2nd Baronet (England, 1785 – 31 August 1814, Fairlee, Maryland) was an English naval officer, the son of Vice-Admiral Christopher Parker and Augusta Byron.

Biography 
Parker was the descendant of several Royal Navy flag officers. His father was the son of Admiral Sir Peter Parker, and his mother the daughter of Vice-Admiral John Byron. Educated at Westminster School, he entered the Royal Navy in 1798, serving under his grandfather and his grandfather's friend, Lord Nelson in Victory. He rapidly rose through the ranks, and was promoted in May 1804 to Commander. The next year he took command of the brig Weazel. The Weazel was the first British vessel to sight the Franco-Spanish fleet leaving Cádiz, an action that precipitated the Battle of Trafalgar. For this service he was promoted to Captain.

Parker was briefly a Member of Parliament. He was returned unopposed as a Tory for the Irish borough constituency of Wexford at a by-election held on 3 March 1810. He resigned the seat in 1811 and was replaced at a by-election on 1 July 1811.

In 1810, he was given command of the frigate , which he commissioned. Within weeks of commissioning she was involved in the suppression of a mutiny aboard Africaine. The notoriously brutal Captain Robert Corbet had been appointed to command Africaine and the crew had protested and refused to allow him to board. The Admiralty sent three popular officers to negotiate with the crew and ordered Menelaus to come alongside. If the crew of Africaine refused to agree with the appointment of Corbet, Parker had been ordered to fire on the ship until they submitted. The crew eventually agreed to allow Corbet aboard and Menelaus did not have to fire on Africaine. In the summer of 1810, Parker sailed for the Indian Ocean to reinforce the squadron operating against Île de France, where he participated in the capture of the island in December 1810.

In 1812, Menelaus was part of the blockade of Toulon in the Mediterranean and operated against coastal harbours, shipping and privateers off the southern coast of France with some success. In 1813, the frigate was transferred to the Atlantic for service convoying merchant ships to Canada in the War of 1812. Menelaus was subsequently employed in raiding American positions along the Maryland coastline, destroying a coastal convoy in September. In 1814, Parker was ordered to operate against French ships in the Atlantic and recaptured a valuable Spanish merchant ship in January.

In 1814, following the French surrender, Menelaus was assigned to the North American Station and sent to Bermuda, which had been identified in 1783, on the independence of the United States, as potentially Britain's most important North American naval base (safer than Halifax against both naval and overland attack, and in a position, 640 miles off North Carolina, to dominate the Atlantic Seaboard) where the Royal Navy had been operating since 1795 from St. George's Town (with the Admiralty House nearby at Mount Wyndham, in Hamilton Parish), at the East End, while the Royal Naval Dockyard was under construction at the West End. With the outbreak of the American War of 1812, the blockade of the American Atlantic coast (from which New England, where support for the war was low and upon which Britain relied for grain, was at first spared) was orchestrated from Bermuda throughout the war. In August 1814, a force of 2,500 soldiers under General Robert Ross freed from the Peninsular War arrived in Bermuda aboard , three frigates, three sloops and ten other vessels, intended to be used for diversionary raids along the coasts of Maryland and Virginia. In response to Sir George Prévost's request for an attack in retaliation for the "wanton destruction of private property along the north shores of Lake Erie" by American forces under Colonel John Campbell in May 1814, the most notable being the Raid on Port Dover) to draw United States forces away from the Canadian border., they were instead used, along with the naval and military units already on the station, to strike at Washington, D.C. in the Chesapeake Campaign, resulting in British victory at the Battle of Bladensburg, the Burning of Washington, and the Raid on Alexandria, and a failed attempt on Baltimore.

From Bermuda, Parker joined the British forces in the Chesapeake Bay under Admiral Sir George Cockburn and took part in the blockade of Baltimore. A bold and efficient commander, he became known for his ferocity in destroying American farms and property along the Chesapeake. Having for several days raided Kent County, Maryland, he landed a shore party and attempted a night attack on a detachment of Maryland militia at Fairlee, Maryland on the night of 30 August 1814. Parker, who had recently liberated four slaves after raiding the plantation of Richard Frisby, was told by one slave that there was an American militia unit nearby. Parker landed the Menelaus at Tolchester, Maryland and had the slave guide him to the position. There he met resistance from the 21st Maryland Militia under command of Lt. Colonel Phillip Reed in the corn field of Isaac Caulk. This precipitated the Battle of Caulk's Field; while British and American sources differ on the result of the battle, Parker was one of the casualties. Leading his marines, he was hit in the thigh (as his grandfather had been at the Battle of Sullivan's Island), but unlike his grandfather, Parker died on the field of a severed femoral artery. According to midshipman Frederick Chamier, "“The whole animation of the party died when he drooped,” Chamier said in his account. “The Americans fortunately had begun another retreat; and our ceasing fire only led them to believe that we were following the quicker. Sir Peter’s only words were these: ‘I fear they have done for me … you had better retreat, for the boats are a long way off.” It took only about 10 minutes for Parker to bleed to death. 14 men under Parker's command died at Caulk's Field, 12 of which remain buried in unmarked graves at the site of the battle.

Parker's body was sent to St. George's, Bermuda, and buried at St. Peter's Church on the 14 October 1814 (the funeral service being conducted by Chaplain Rennell of HMS Albion), but at the request of one of his executors, Captain Edmund Palmer, was subsequently exhumed on the 2 April 1815 (by Rector of St. George's Philip Hudson), and transported to England aboard the frigate HMS Hebrus to be re-interred at the family vault at St Margaret's, Westminster, a public funeral with military honors being held on both occasions. He was eulogized by his first cousin, Lord Byron.

Family 
Parker married Marianne Dallas, daughter of Sir George Dallas, 1st Bt. They had three sons:
Commander Sir Peter Parker, 3rd Baronet (1809–1835), promoted to commander on 3 March 1834, then of HMS Vernon
? Parker (d. bef. 1835)
George Parker (February 1815 – 23 November 1817), died of croup.

Notes

References 
 
Naval career
Dallas, Sir George (1815) A biographical memoir of the late Sir Peter Parker: baronet, captain of His Majesty's ship Menelaus, of 38 guns, killed in action while storming the American camp at Bellair, near Baltimore, on the thirty-first of August, 1814. (Longman, Hurst, Rees, Orme, and Brown).
Political career
The Parliaments of England by Henry Stooks Smith (1st edition published in three volumes 1844–50), 2nd edition edited (in one volume) by F.W.S. Craig (Political Reference Publications 1973)
Parliamentary Election Results in Ireland, 1801–1922, edited by B.M. Walker (Royal Irish Academy 1978)

External links 
 

1785 births
1814 deaths
Byron family
People educated at Westminster School, London
Royal Navy officers
Parker, Sir Peter, 2nd Baronet
Parker, Sir Peter, 2nd Baronet
Parker, Sir Peter, 2nd Baronet
Royal Navy personnel of the Napoleonic Wars
Royal Navy personnel of the War of 1812
British military personnel killed in the War of 1812